Funeral Home (originally released as Cries in the Night) is a 1980 Canadian slasher film directed by William Fruet and starring Lesleh Donaldson, Kay Hawtrey, Jack Van Evera, Alf Humphreys, and Harvey Atkin. The plot follows a teenager spending the summer at her grandmother's inn—formerly a funeral home—where guests begin to disappear.

Originally released in Canada in 1980 under the title Cries in the Night, the film was re-titled for its 1982 U.S. theatrical and home video releases as Funeral Home.

Plot 
At the beginning of the summer, Heather arrives in a small unnamed town to stay with her grandmother, Maude Chalmers, whose house—a former funeral home—has recently been converted into an inn. Maude's husband, James, an undertaker, has been missing for several years, and she has been forced to make a living selling artificial flower arrangements in town; she hopes to supplant her income by opening the home to traveling guests. Billy Hibbs, a mentally-challenged man, lives with Maude as the property handyman.

Nearby, a farmer named Sam reports an abandoned vehicle discovered on his property, which is traced to a missing real estate developer who had been surveying the area. At the inn on the evening of Heather's arrival, guests Harry Browning and his mistress Florie check in. When Maude realizes the couple are unmarried, she asks them to leave, but they refuse. That evening after having drinks, they drive to a local quarry recommended by Heather; while there, Maude's truck arrives, smashing the back of their car and pushing them into the water below, where they both drown. The same night, Heather goes on a date with Rick, a local teenager, and returns home to hear her Maude speaking to an unseen man in the basement. When she inquires, Maude denies it.

The next day, while Maude is in town, Rick stops by the house. He tells Heather that her grandfather, James, was a known alcoholic, and recounts a story from his childhood in which Mr. Chalmers had locked he and a friend in the funeral home's basement to scare them. The two explore the property while Maude is gone; in the garage, they discover Mr. Chalmer's Cadillac hearse, and Heather finds a necklace with the initials "H.D." engraved on it. That evening, Heather again hears Maude speaking to someone in the basement, this time arguing with a male voice about a woman named "Helena Davis." Heather discovers Helena has been missing for some time, and was rumored to have eloped with her grandfather. Mr. Davis, Helena's husband, arrives at the house to ask Maude about the alleged affair, which she denies ever occurred. Later that evening, Mr. Davis is murdered with a pickaxe.

The following day while Heather and Rick are swimming in the quarry, Florie and Harry's bodies are discovered. Heather confides in Rick that she believes her grandmother is hiding someone in the basement. That evening, they return to the house. Upon finding that Maude is not home, the two decide to explore the basement. There they discover Billy's corpse, and are attacked by Maude, who, imitating her husband's voice, scolds Heather for coming into the basement. Maude attempts to kill Heather with an axe and she flees through the basement, discovering a hidden room where James's corpse rests in a bed of Maude's artificial flowers. Just as Maude is about to strike Heather with the axe, she lapses out of her dissociative identity. The police arrive at the scene in the basement, and Joe, a local police officer, asks Maude if they can talk about what has occurred. She agrees, so long as she can prepare a cup of tea.

Later, Joe explains to a news reporter that Maude had murdered James and Helena, his mistress, after discovering their affair. After, she preserved James's corpse, and buried both Helena and Mr. Davis in the local graveyard.

Cast 
Kay Hawtrey as Maude Chalmers
Lesleh Donaldson as Heather
Barry Morse as Mr. Davis
Dean Garbett as Rick Yates
Stephen E. Miller as Billy Hibbs
Alf Humphreys as Joe Yates
Peggy Mahon as Florie
Harvey Atkin as Harry Browning
Robert Warner as Sheriff
Jack Van Evera as James Chalmers
Les Rubie as Sam
Doris Petrie as Ruby
Bill Lake as Frank
Brett Matthew Davidson as Young Rick
Christopher Crabb as Teddy
Robert Craig as Barry Oaks
Linda Dalby as Linda
Gerard Jordan as Pete
Eleanor Beecroft as Shirley

Production 
The budget for the film was roughly CAD$ 1,431,780 and the production was filmed from July 23, 1979 to September 12, 1979. It as shot on location in several cities in Ontario, including Elora, Guelph, Markham, and Toronto. The building that stood in for the Chalmers Funeral Home was in actuality not a funeral home; it was a spacious mansion with gables located on Reesor Road in Markham, Ontario, and this house was later used again in an episode of the 1990s Canadian-American horror anthology series Goosebumps (as the O'Dell House in the 2-part episode "Night of the Living Dummy III"), which William Fruet co-produced. The scenes at the quarry were filmed at the Elora Quarry in Elora, Ontario; this quarry has been a conservation park and public beach since the 1970s, and unlike the Reesor mansion, can be visited by tourists. Both locations were sought out and booked for filming in advance by Fruet.

According to actress Lesleh Donaldson, actress Kay Hawtrey and director William Fruet did not get along well, stating that "She couldn’t stand him. She hated him. Just hated him." She also recalled Hawtrey "...being a nervous wreck nearly every morning. And then she claimed Bill was making her do stuff at the end that was too much for her. In the scene where she's down in the cellar, there were a lot of crew guys doubling for her, with the axe and swinging stuff around. It wasn’t her doing that."

On director Fruet, Donaldson stated that she "knew that he would do things off-the-cuff at the last minute, like changing a scene. [I] might not have been called in that day and suddenly I’d get a call telling me "Get to the set now!", and I’d have to do a scene I hadn’t memorized yet. It was tense that way."

Release 
The film was released in Canada in 1980 by Frontier Amusements under its original title, Cries in the Night. Two years later, it received a theatrical release in the United States through Motion Picture Marketing (MPM) under the alternate title Funeral Home.

Reception 
The film has received mixed to positive reception in recent years, with AllMovie, in their summary of the film, stating that "...Funeral Home serves up a generous supply of shudders even for non-fans of the horror genre." In a retrospective analysis, critic and film historian John Kenneth Muir said the film is "slow as molasses and lacking in both surprises and punch," and negatively compared it to imitating Alfred Hitchcock's Psycho (1960).

Thomas Ellison of Retro Slashers.net gave the film a positive review, stating that "Funeral Home is the type of slasher that relies on story and actor performances...Fruet takes a much more atmospheric route." However that the ending "...borrows too heavily from another slasher film."

Home media
The film was released on VHS by Vouge Video in Canada in 1982 and Paragon Video in 1983 and again in 1986 as a big box reissue. It was officially released on DVD by Mill Creek Entertainment in 2005; however, this release was sourced from a low-quality VHS transfer.

Soundtrack 
A soundtrack to the film was released on October 25, 2011 by Intrada Records as part of their Intrada Special Collection Series.

All tracks were composed by Jerry Fielding. The film was his second-to last score.

Awards and nominations
Funeral Home was nominated for three Genie Awards:

Best Actress: Lesleh Donaldson
Best Editing: Ralph Brunjes
Best Sound Editing: Andy Herman, Dave Appleby, Joe Grimaldi, Gary Bourgeois, Austin Grimaldi, and Ian Hendry

See also

Hotel Infierno - A 2015 Argentine film with a similar plot

References

Sources

External links 
 
Cries in the Night (Funeral Home) at AllMovie

1980 horror films
1980 films
1980s psychological thriller films
1980s slasher films
Canadian independent films
Canadian slasher films
Films about dissociative identity disorder
English-language Canadian films
Films directed by William Fruet
Films set in hotels
Films shot in Toronto
Funeral homes in fiction
1980s psychological horror films
Religious horror films
Films scored by Jerry Fielding
1980s English-language films
1980s Canadian films